This is a list of baseball tabletop games. Some of them are still available, some of them are not on the market anymore.

 All Star Baseball
 APBA Baseball - http://apbagames.com/
 Baseball (card game)'''
 Challenge The Yankees Diceball Dynasty League Baseball Replay Baseball Statis Pro Baseball - http://forums.delphiforums.com/statprobaseball/start
 Strat-O-Matic Baseball - https://www.strat-o-matic.com/
 Pocket Ballpark - https://www.madpacksgames.com/pocket-ballpark.html
 Boardofdreams'' - https://www.boardofdreams.it/
• Triple Threat Baseball

Tabletop games
Tabletop games
Board games